The 2011 Pavel Roman Memorial was the 17th edition of an annual international ice dancing competition held in Olomouc, Czech Republic. The event was held on November 18–20, 2011 at the Zimní Stadion Olomouc. Ice dancers competed on the senior, junior, advanced novice, and basic novice levels.

Results

Senior

 WD = Withdrew

Junior

Advanced novice

Basic novice

External links
 Result details (Archives: Senior, Junior, Advanced novice, Basic novice)
 2011 Pavel Roman Memorial
 Entries

Pavel Roman Memorial, 2011
Pavel Roman Memorial
Pavel Roman Memorial